The Hunt is a 1977 jazz album of performances from 1947 by a nonet featuring saxophonists Dexter Gordon and Wardell Gray. The title song is referenced in the book On the Road by Jack Kerouac.

Track listing
"Disorder at the Border" – 19:20
"Cherokee" – 21:12
"Byas-A-Drink" – 19:15
"The Hunt (A/K/A Rocks 'n Shoals)" – 18:05

Personnel
Dexter Gordon – tenor saxophone
Harry Babasin – double bass
Red Callender – double bass
Sonny Criss – alto saxophone
Wardell Gray – tenor saxophone
Hampton Hawes – piano
Connie Kay – drum kits
Barney Kessel – guitar
Ken Kennedy – drums
Howard McGhee – trumpet
Trummy Young – trombone

References

1977 albums
Dexter Gordon albums
Savoy Records albums
Albums produced by Ralph Bass